Elijah McCall (born March 3, 1988 in Chicago, Illinois) is an American former heavyweight boxer.  He is the son of former heavyweight champion Oliver McCall.

Early life
Elijah passed on a football scholarship at James Madison University.  to pursue boxing. .
he was a star highschool running back at Bassett high school in Virginia.

Boxing career
Elijah has had 16 pro bouts to date, with 12 wins (11 by knockout), 3 losses (All by KO or TKO), and 1 draw.
He was surprisingly knocked out in the fourth round after dominating Dieuly Aristilde, after dropping him twice in the first round, yet went on to get flattened with a right hand himself in the fourth.

Professional boxing record (Incomplete)

See also

 Notable boxing families

External links
 

1988 births
Living people
African-American boxers
Boxers from Chicago
American male boxers
Heavyweight boxers
21st-century African-American sportspeople
20th-century African-American people